Dalton Jérson Trevisan (born 14 June 1925) is a Brazilian author of short stories. He has been described as an "acclaimed short-story chronicler of lower-class mores and popular dramas."

His short stories are inspired in the daily life of his home city of Curitiba, though featuring characters and situations of universal meaning. His extremely concise and refined tales have been called "Haikus in prose". They are often based on dialogue, using a popular language, and underline the torturing and absurd aspects of everyday life. Often brutal, his narratives can be considered the reverse of moral tales, exposing a culture of perversion and violence underlying middle class hypocrisy.

As of 2021, only two of his books have been translated into English, Novels Not at All Exemplary and The Vampire of Curitiba, both in 1972 by translator Gregory Rabassa.

His reclusive behavior, added to his longevity and the content of his work, gave him the nickname "The Vampire of Curitiba".

He graduated from the Federal University of Paraná in legal studies but seldom worked in the law profession.

Joaquim 
Dalton Trevisan was the editor of a magazine called Joaquim (portuguese: Revista Joaquim), which put Paraná on the map of brazilian literary discussions in the 1940s.  The magazine had a total of 21 issues and circulated between April 1946 and December 1948. Joaquim was responsible for the first publication in Portuguese of texts by T. S. Elliot, Franz Kafka, Louis Aragon, Tristan Tzara, Garcia Lorca, Rainer Maria Rilke, André Gide and Jean Paul Sartre. Among the sporadic contributors to the magazine it is possible to list Vinícius de Moraes, Carlos Drummond de Andrade, Mario de Andrade, Oswald de Andrade and Antônio Cândido. The name "Joaquim" was chosen as a common, proximate and universal name in Brazil.

Joaquim's pages displayed original artwork by plastic artists such as Candido Portinari, Di Cavalcanti, Guido Viaro and Poty Lazzarotto. Lazzarotto would remain a great editorial partner of Trevisan in the following decades.

Works

 Abismo de Rosas (1976)
 Ah, É? (1994)
 A Faca No Coração (1975)
 A Guerra Conjugal (1969)
 A Polaquinha (1985) (novel)
 Arara Bêbada (2004)
 A Trombeta do Anjo Vingador (1977)
 Capitu Sou Eu (2003)
 Cemitério de Elefantes (1964)
 111 Ais (2000)
 Chorinho Brejeiro (1981)
 Contos Eróticos (1984)
 Crimes de Paixão (1978)
 Desastres do Amor (1968)
 Dinorá – Novos Mistérios (1994)
 234 (1997)
 Em Busca de Curitiba Perdida (1992)
 Essas Malditas Mulheres (1982)
 Gente Em Conflito (com Antônio de Alcântara Machado) (2004)
 Lincha Tarado (1980)
 Macho não ganha flor (2006)
 Meu Querido Assassino (1983)
 Morte na Praça (1964)
 Mistérios de Curitiba (1968)
 Noites de Amor em Granada
 Novelas nada Exemplares (1959)
 99 Corruíras Nanicas (2002)
 O Grande Deflorador (2002)
 O Pássaro de Cinco Asas (1974)
 O Rei da Terra (1972)
 O Vampiro de Curitiba (1965) (The Vampire of Curitiba)
 Pão e Sangue (1988)
 Pico na veia (2002)
 Primeiro Livro de Contos (1979)
 Quem tem medo de vampiro? (1998)
 Vinte Contos Menores (1979)
 Virgem Louca, Loucos Beijos (1979)
 Vozes do Retrato – Quinze Histórias de Mentiras e Verdades (1998)

References

External links
 Projeto Releitura (in Portuguese)
 Oxford Anthology of the Brazilian Short Story
 The Rise of Modern Literature in Southern Brazil

1925 births
Living people
People from Curitiba
Federal University of Paraná alumni
Camões Prize winners
20th-century Brazilian male writers
21st-century Brazilian male writers
20th-century Brazilian short story writers
21st-century Brazilian short story writers
Brazilian male short story writers